Erigeron latifolius is a rare and little-known Chinese species of flowering plants in the family Asteraceae. It grows on mountain meadows at high elevations in Sichuan province in southwestern China. It was not formally described as a new species until 2010.

Erigeron latifolius is a perennial clump-forming herb up to 50 cm (20 inches) tall, forming a rhizome and an underground caudex. Its flower heads have purple ray florets surrounding yellow disc florets.

References

latifolius
Flora of Sichuan
Plants described in 2010